The spot-throat (Modulatrix stictigula) is a species of bird in the family Modulatricidae. It is the only member of the genus Modulatrix.
It is found in Tanzania and northern Malawi.
Its natural habitat is subtropical or tropical moist montane forests.

This species is monotypic, although it was previously thought to have two subspecies.

References

Modulatricidae
Birds of East Africa
Birds described in 1906
Taxonomy articles created by Polbot